Lee County Courthouse is a historic courthouse located at Sanford, Lee County, North Carolina. It was built in 1908, and is a two-story rectangular brick building in the Classical Revival style.  The east and west sides features monumental hexastyle porticoes supported by Ionic order brick columns.  Atop the hipped roof is a small dome.

It was listed on the National Register of Historic Places in 1979.

References

County courthouses in North Carolina
Courthouses on the National Register of Historic Places in North Carolina
Neoclassical architecture in North Carolina
Government buildings completed in 1908
Buildings and structures in Lee County, North Carolina
National Register of Historic Places in Lee County, North Carolina
1908 establishments in North Carolina